Maria Palmer (born Maria Pichler, 5 September 1917 – 6 September 1981) was an Austrian-born American actress.

Early life
Palmer was born and raised in Vienna, Austria-Hungary (now Vienna, Austria) on 5 September 1917. She first appeared on stage as a child actor, in various Max Reinhardt productions. She trained as a dancer, and was a member of the Bodenwieser Ensemble. She later studied drama and voice at the Vienna Conservatory.

Career
In 1938, a year before the outbreak of war, Palmer emigrated with her parents to the United States. She first performed on the stage in New York City, most notably in the 1942 production of The Moon Is Down.

She moved into film, helping to meet Hollywood's demand for exotic foreign women for war films and films noir. Her debut was playing Catherine de' Medici in the 1942 short Nostradamus and the Queen. Her feature film debut was in Mission to Moscow (1943). She continued in 1944 with Days of Glory, opposite Gregory Peck, and later that year, Lady on a Train.

In the 1950s, her film career declined and she went into radio, television and commercials. She even started her own production company, called Maria Palmer Enterprises. In the early 1960s, Palmer hosted her own Los Angeles show, entitled "Sincerely, Maria Palmer". She appeared as Nora Krasner in the 1963 Perry Mason episode "The Case of Lawful Lazarus" and as murderer Florence Wood in the 1962 episode "The Case of the Borrowed Baby".  In her later years, Palmer wrote a number of unproduced television screenplays, often using the pseudonym Eliot Parker White. In 1962, she played "Elsa" in the episode "The Immigrants" on CBS's Rawhide and Marushka Vesterhauzy on the episode  "A Bird of Warning" on NBC's Sam Benedict.
Her papers, covering the years 1922–1975, are held by the Academy of Motion Picture Arts and Sciences.

Personal life
When she was 16, Palmer married Dr. Franz Marmorek; they later divorced.

Later life
Palmer died of cancer at Cedars-Sinai Medical Center in Los Angeles on 6 September 1981, the day after her 64th birthday. She was buried at Forest Lawn Memorial Park, Hollywood Hills, California.

Filmography

References

External links
 
 
 

1917 births
1981 deaths
American film actresses
American stage actresses
Actresses from Vienna
Burials at Forest Lawn Memorial Park (Hollywood Hills)
Deaths from cancer in California
20th-century American actresses
Austrian emigrants to the United States